Samauma (in Brazil, or samahuma in Peru) may refer to:

 Ceiba pentandra  
 Ceiba samauma
 Samaúma (or sumaúma), the fibre obtained from the fruit of the above tree species

See also
 Gleba Samaúma in Guajará-Mirim municipality, western Rondônia, Brazil